California Proposition 58 may refer to:

 California Proposition 58 (2004)
 California Proposition 58 (2016)